Lindroth is a surname of Swedish origin. Notable people with the surname include:

Carl H. Lindroth (1905-1979), Swedish entomologist
Eric Lindroth, American retired water polo player
Helen Lindroth (1874–1956), Swedish-born American screen and stage actress
John Lindroth (athlete) (1906–1974), Finnish pole vaulter
John Lindroth (gymnast) (1883–1960), Finnish gymnast
Lasse Lindroth (1972–1999), Swedish comedian, actor and writer
Linda Lindroth (1946—), American artist
Lloyd Lindroth (1931–1994), American harpist
Scott Lindroth, American composer and teacher
Sten Lindroth (1914–1980), Swedish historian of education and science
Amy Cecilia Lindroth (1993-present),  Artist and Musician

Swedish-language surnames